Moshe Meron (born 22 March 1926) is an Israeli lawyer and former politician who served as a member of the Knesset for Likud between 1977 and 1981.

Biography
Born Moshe Segal in Königsberg in Germany (today Kaliningrad in Russia), Meron made aliyah to Mandatory Palestine in 1936. He attended the Jerusalem School of Law and was certified as a lawyer. Between 1948 and 1949 he worked as a lawyer for the Israeli Air Force.

A member of Ramat Gan city council, he served as deputy mayor between 1969 and 1977. In 1977 he was elected to the Knesset on the Likud list. He was appointed Deputy Speaker and chaired the House Committee. He lost his seat in the 1981 elections, and returned to working as a lawyer, briefly serving as Ramat Gan's deputy mayor again in 1981. He has also been a member of the board of directors of several companies and research institutions.

References

External links

1926 births
Living people
Deputy mayors of places in Israel
Deputy Speakers of the Knesset
Jewish emigrants from Nazi Germany to Mandatory Palestine
Israeli lawyers
Jewish Israeli politicians
Likud politicians
Members of the 9th Knesset (1977–1981)
People from Ramat Gan